Chirilă is a Romanian surname. Notable people with the surname include:

Ionuț Chirilă
Josif Chirilă
Oana Chirilă
Traian V. Chirilă
Ioan Chirilă, sports broadcaster and sports novelist
Ioan-Cristian Chirilă, chess player

Romanian-language surnames